The Annunciation is a painting widely attributed to the Italian Renaissance artist Leonardo da Vinci, dated to . Leonardo's earliest extant major work, it was completed in Florence while he was an apprentice in the studio of Andrea del Verrocchio. The painting was made oil and tempera on a large poplar panel and depicts the Annunciation, a popular biblical subject in 15th-century Florence. Since 1867 it has been housed in the Uffizi in Florence, the city where it was created. Though the work has been criticized for inaccuracies in its composition, it is among the best known portrayals of the Annunciation in Christian art.

Description
The subject matter of the work is drawn from Luke 1.26–39. It depicts the angel Gabriel announcing to Mary that she would conceive miraculously and give birth to a son to be named Jesus and called "the Son of God", whose reign would never end. The subject of the annunciation was very popular for contemporaneous artworks painted in Christian countries such as Italy and had been depicted many times in Florentine art, including several examples by the Early Renaissance painter Fra Angelico. Details of the commission for the painting and its early history remain obscure.

The marble table in front of Mary probably is derived from the tomb of Piero and Giovanni de' Medici in the Basilica of San Lorenzo, Florence, which Verrocchio had sculpted during this same period. The angel holds a Madonna lily, a symbol of Mary's virginity as well as that of the city of Florence. 

It is presumed that, being a keen observer of nature, Leonardo painted the wings of the angel to resemble those of a bird in flight, but later, the wings were lengthened dramatically by another artist. 

Although this is the earliest known commissioned painting by Leonardo, it has been pointed out that the painting already bears characteristics that are described as demonstrating his signature work, the innovations he introduced in his paintings: sfumato and atmospheric perspective.

Modern history
Following Gustav Waagen methods in 1869, Baron Liphart identified this Annunciation, that newly arrived in the Uffizi Gallery from the church of San Bartolomeo a Monte Oliveto in Florence, as by the young Leonardo while he still was working in the studio of his master, Andrea del Verrocchio. Before that determination by Liphart the painting had been attributed to Domenico Ghirlandaio.

When the Annunciation came to the Uffizi in 1867, from the Olivetan monastery of San Bartolomeo near Florence, it was ascribed to Domenico Ghirlandaio who, like Leonardo, was an apprentice in the workshop of Andrea del Verrocchio. In 1869, Karl Eduard von Liphart, the central figure of the German expatriate art colony in Florence, recognized the painting as a youthful work by Leonardo. It was one of the first attributions of a surviving work to the youthful Leonardo. Since then, a Leonardo drawing in a collection at Christ Church Picture Gallery in Oxford was recognized as a preparatory drawing for the sleeve of the angel, further supporting the attribution to Leonardo.

Occasionally, some immaturity in Leonardo's painting technique is noted by art critics when discussing the spatial relationship between Mary and the desk and the marble table on which it rests.

Controversy
On March 12, 2007, the painting was at the center of a furor between Italian citizens and the Minister of Culture, who decided to loan the painting for an exhibition in Japan.

Gallery

Notes

References

Sources

External links

Leonardo da Vinci: anatomical drawings from the Royal Library, Windsor Castle - the full The Metropolitan Museum of Art exhibition catalog that is online as a PDF contains material on Annunciation (see index)

1470s paintings
Paintings by Andrea del Verrocchio
Leonardo
Paintings in the collection of the Uffizi
Paintings by Leonardo da Vinci
Books in art
Seashells in art
Ships in art